The Hyundai Aura is a subcompact car produced by the South Korean manufacturer Hyundai. It is a sedan based on the third generation Hyundai i10 (Hyundai Grand i10 Nios in India), and was designed primarily for the Indian market. It is the successor to the Hyundai Xcent, a different nameplate is used as the Xcent continued in production mainly for fleet and commercial customers. The Aura was launched on 21 January 2020 in India.

The Aura features an 8.0-inch touchscreen infotainment with Android Auto system and Apple CarPlay compatibility, a Arkamys music system and a half-digital instrument cluster. Additionally, it is also well equipped with comfort features such as wireless charging, rear AC vent, rear centre armrest.

The Aura is available with three engine options. The only diesel option is the U-Line 1.2 L turbodiesel producing . The petrol engine is a 1.2 L naturally aspirated petrol engine shared with the Grand i10 Nios, and a 1.0 L turbocharged GDI petrol unit which can generate  of peak power.

The Hyundai Aura CNG has a 1.2-liter petrol engine that can run on both petrol and CNG. The engine is BS6 compliant and produces a maximum power of 68 horsepower at 6,000rpm and a maximum torque of 95Nm at 4,000rpm.

The facelift Aura was launched on 23 January 2023 in India, it features a redesigned front fascia.

References 

Front-wheel-drive vehicles
Aura
Aura
Subcompact cars
Cars introduced in 2020